A recordable offence is any offence in England and Wales where the police must keep records of convictions and offenders on the Police National Computer.

Legislation

The power for police to keep such records is contained in the National Police Records (Recordable Offences) Regulations 2000. This states that a 'crime recordable offence' is an offence which must be recorded as a conviction on the PNC.

Recordable offences include any offence punishable by imprisonment, plus a number of non-imprisonable offences, such as:

 nuisance communications (phone calls, letters)
 tampering with motor vehicles
 firearms, air weapons, knives
 football offences
 causing harm or danger to children
 drunkenness
 poaching
 failing to provide a specimen of breath, and
 taking a pedal cycle without owner's consent

A full, lengthy, list of recordable offences is available, provided by ACPO as an Appendix to their Retention Guidelines for Nominal Records on the Police National Computer.

Further police powers

Where a person has been arrested for a recordable offence, police may fingerprint and take non-intimate DNA samples from suspects without authorisation from senior ranks.

Sources

External links
 

Law enforcement